The 2021 ACB Playoffs, also known as 2021 Liga Endesa Playoffs for sponsorship reasons, was the postseason tournament of the ACB's 2020–21 season, which began on 19 September 2020. The playoffs started on May 31 after the EuroLeague Final Four, which was played on May 28–30, and ended on June 15 before the Olympic Qualifying Tournaments, which will be played on June 29–July 4.

TD Systems Baskonia was the defending champion which got knocked out by Valencia Basket in the quarterfinals. Barça claimed their 16th ACB title and their 19th Spanish title, ending a 7-year drought, by downing archrivals Real Madrid in Game 2 of the Finals. Barça swept the series and completed its first Spanish double (League and Cup titles) since 2011.

Format
On May 4, 2021, ACB delayed the regular season ending calendar one week to play the postponed matches. With Barça's already qualified to the EuroLeague Final Four in Cologne, the playoffs will be played in best-of-three, instead of best-of-five as usual. Only if there had been no Spanish representation in the Final Four, the finals would have been played to best-of-five.

At the end of the regular season, the eight teams with the most wins qualified for the playoffs. The seedings were based on each team's record. The bracket was fixed; there was no reseeding. All rounds were best-of-three series; the series ended when one team won two games, and that team advanced to the next round. All rounds, including the Finals, were in a 1–1–1 format. Home court advantage went to the team with the better regular season record, and, if needed, ties were broken based on head-to-head record.

Playoff qualifying
On March 16, 2021, Real Madrid became the first team to clinch a playoff spot.

Bracket
Teams in bold advanced to the next round. The numbers to the left of each team indicate the team's seeding, the numbers to the right indicate the result of games including result in bold of the team that won in that game, and the numbers furthest to the right indicate the number of games the team won in that round.

Quarterfinals
All times are in Central European Summer Time (UTC+02:00)

Real Madrid v Herbalife Gran Canaria

This was the fourth playoff meeting between these two teams, with Real Madrid winning the previous three meetings.

Barça v Joventut

This was the 13th playoff meeting between these two teams, with Barça winning nine of the first 12 meetings.

Lenovo Tenerife v Hereda San Pablo Burgos

This was the first meeting in the playoffs between Lenovo Tenerife and Hereda San Pablo Burgos.

Valencia Basket v TD Systems Baskonia

This was the fifth playoff meeting between these two teams, with TD Systems Baskonia winning three of the first four meetings.

Semifinals
All times are in Central European Summer Time (UTC+02:00)

Real Madrid v Valencia Basket

This was the seventh playoff meeting between these two teams, with Real Madrid winning five of the first six meetings.

Barça v Lenovo Tenerife

This was the first meeting in the playoffs between Barça and Lenovo Tenerife.

Finals
All times are in Central European Summer Time (UTC+02:00)

This was the 20th playoff meeting between these two teams, with Real Madrid winning 10 of the first 19 meetings.

References

External links
 Official website 

2021
playoffs